The First Presbyterian Church in Flemingsburg, Kentucky is a historic church at W. Main and W. Water Streets.  It was built in 1819 and added to the National Register in 1977.

It is notable as it is "one of the oldest Presbyterian meeting houses in the State, and is the major known surviving work of
the fine local architect-builders, Samuel Stockwell and John Eckles."

References

See also
National Register of Historic Places listings in Kentucky

Presbyterian churches in Kentucky
Churches on the National Register of Historic Places in Kentucky
Churches completed in 1819
19th-century Presbyterian church buildings in the United States
National Register of Historic Places in Fleming County, Kentucky
1819 establishments in Kentucky